Granato is a surname. Notable people with the surname include:

Anthony Granato (born 1981), Italian–Canadian baseball player
Cammi Granato (born 1971), American ice hockey player
Don Granato (born 1967), American ice hockey player
Luciana Granato (born 1977), Brazilian rower
Nick Granato (born 1963), American folk singer-songwriter
Tony Granato (born 1964), American ice hockey player